This article is intended as a catalogue of sleeping carriages used by the Victorian Railways and successors.

O type carriages

E type carriages

Long W type carriages

Pullman carriages

Southern Aurora carriages

The Overland carriages

S type carriages

Z type carriages

References 

Victorian Railways carriages